Seuratidae is a family of nematodes belonging to the order Rhabditida.

Genera

Genera:
 Bainechina Smales, 1999
 Chabaudechina Smales, 1999
 Durettechina Smales, 2000

References

Nematodes